Radhashtami is a Hindu holy day commemorating the birth anniversary of the goddess Radha, the chief consort of the god Krishna. It is celebrated with great fervor in her birthplace Barsana and the entire Braj region on the eighth day (Ashtami) of the Shukla Paksha of the month of Bhadrapada. The festival suggests that goddess Radha is very much an aspect of the cultural-religious faith system governing social life of people.

History

In the Viṣṇu Khaṇḍa of the Skanda Purana, it is mentioned that God Krishna had 16,000 gopis out of which Goddess Radha was the most prominent one. According to Hindu calendar, Radharani was born on the 8th day (Ashtami) of the bright fortnight (Shukla Paksha) in the month of Bhadrapada in Anuradha Nakshatra at 12 noon in town of Barsana (Rawal), Uttar Pradesh, India. As per the Gregorian calendar, her birth date was believed to be 23 September 3221 BC- a Wednesday. Goddess Radha was found on the golden lotus in the pond by king Vrishabhanu and his wife Kirtida. As per folktales, Radha did not open her eyes to see the world until Krishna himself appeared in front of her.

Fasting and celebration

Traditionally, followers of Gaudiya Vaishnavism (which includes ISKCON devotees) and devotees of goddess Radha observe the Radha Ashtami Vrat (fast). Devotees usually follow a half-day fast on this day. But, like Ekadashi, some devotees observe this fast for full day and some even without water. In ISKCON temples Mahabhishek of Radharani is done on this day.

Radhashtami is ceremoniously celebrated in the Braj area. On Radhashtami, Radha Krishna idols are traditionally dressed entirely in flowers. Additionally, Radhashtami is the only day on which devotees may receive darshan of Radha's feet. On all other days, they remain covered.

Radhashtami begins with a ritual bath. In homes and temples, idol of goddess Radha is bathed with panchamitra - a combination of five different foodmixes of milk, ghee, honey, sugar and yogurt and then she is dressed in new attire. She is then offered bhog, food made especially for her. On this day, devotees sing devotional songs in praise of the divine couple Radha Krishna and their pastimes. Later, feast is served as prasada to celebrate this day.

The mantras which are chanted on Radhashtami are: Aum Vrashbahnujaye Vidmahe, Krishnapriyaye Dheemahi Tanno Radha Prachodaya and Radhe Radhe.

Significance
Radhashtami is particularly important for the holy pilgrimage to Manimahesh Lake, called Manimahesh Yatra, which is sponsored by the Government of Himachal Pradesh. It is preceded by the "holy chhari", (holy stick carried by the pilgrims on their shoulders). The pilgrims barefooted, singing and dancing to the hymns of God Shiva, undertake this trek of 14 kilometres (8.7 mi) from the nearest road point of Hadsar, to the Manimahesh Lake.
The Manimahesh Yatra that starts from Krishna Janmashtami, ends after fifteen days with Radhashtami.

See also 
 Krishna Janmashtami
 Radha Rani Temple
 Manipuri Raas Leela

References

External links 

 Sri Radhashtami celebration.

Religious festivals in India
Hindu festivals
Hindu holy days
Hindu festivals in India
Vaishnavism
Birthdays
August observances
September observances